Forty Deuce is a 1982 American drama film directed by Paul Morrissey and starring Orson Bean. It was screened in the Un Certain Regard section at the 1982 Cannes Film Festival.

Cast
 Orson Bean as Mr. Roper
 Kevin Bacon as Ricky
 Mark Keyloun as Blow
 Tommy Citera as Crank
 Esai Morales as Mitchell
 Harris Laskaway as Augie (as Harris Laskawy)
 John Ford Noonan as John Anthony (as John Noonan)
 Meade Roberts as Old John
 Yukio Yamamoto as Street Hustler
 Rudy DeBellis as Toilet John
 Steve Steinlauf as Man on Phone
 Susan Blond as Escort

References

External links

1982 films
1982 LGBT-related films
1982 drama films
American drama films
American LGBT-related films
1980s English-language films
Films directed by Paul Morrissey
LGBT-related drama films
1980s American films